Sporisorium sorghi is a species of fungus in the Ustilaginaceae family. It is a plant pathogen, causing covered smut of sorghum spp. such as Sorghum bicolor (S. vulgare) (sorghum), S. sudanense (Sudan grass), S. halepense (Johnson grass) and Sorghum vulgare var. technichum (broomcorn).

References 

Fungal plant pathogens and diseases
Sorghum diseases
Ustilaginomycotina
Taxa named by Christian Gottfried Ehrenberg